Iligan's at-large congressional district is the congressional district of the Philippines in Iligan. It has been represented in the House of Representatives of the Philippines since 2010, and in the Batasang Pambansa in 1984 to 1986. Previously included in Lanao del Norte's 1st congressional district from 1987 to 2010, and in Lanao del Norte's at-large congressional district prior to 1984, it includes all barangays of the city. It is currently represented in the 19th Congress by Celso G. Regencia of the PDP-Laban party.

Representation history

Election results

2010

2013

2016

2019

See also 
 Legislative district of Iligan

References 

Congressional districts of the Philippines
Politics of Iligan
1984 establishments in the Philippines
At-large congressional districts of the Philippines
Congressional districts of Northern Mindanao
Constituencies established in 1984
Constituencies disestablished in 1987
Constituencies established in 2009